Middletown Historic District is a national historic district located at Middletown, New Castle County, Delaware.  It encompasses 187 contributing buildings in the central business district and surrounding residential areas of Middletown. It is centered on the Middletown crossroads established in the 17th century. Residential buildings include notable examples of the Late Victorian and Federal styles.  Notable non-residential buildings include the Witherspoon Inn (1761), S. M. Reynolds and Company (1871), Delaware Trust Company (1918), People's National Bank (1884), and Forest Presbyterian Church (1851).  Also located in the district is the separately listed Middletown Academy or Town Hall (1827).

It was listed on the National Register of Historic Places in 1978.

References

Historic districts on the National Register of Historic Places in Delaware
Federal architecture in Delaware
Victorian architecture in Delaware
Buildings and structures in New Castle County, Delaware
National Register of Historic Places in New Castle County, Delaware
Middletown, Delaware